Fulton Airport  is a public use airport located two nautical miles (4 km) northwest of the central business district of Fulton, in Fulton County, Kentucky, United States. It is owned by Fulton City & County.

Facilities and aircraft
It has one asphalt paved runway designated 9/27 which measures 2,700 by 60 feet (823 x 18 m).

For the 12-month period ending January 30, 2006, the airport had 7,375 aircraft operations, an average of 20 per day: 98% general aviation, 1% air taxi and 1% military. At that time there were 10 aircraft based at this airport: 70% single-engine and 30% multi-engine.

References

External links
 Aerial photo as of 24 January 1993 from USGS The National Map
 

Airports in Kentucky
Buildings and structures in Fulton County, Kentucky
Transportation in Fulton County, Kentucky